Primula suffrutescens is a species of primrose known by the common name Sierra primrose.

Description 
With a matlike form of a thick, woody base covered in the dried remnants of previous seasons' herbage, Primula suffrutescens is a subshrub growing from a sturdy anchoring rhizome. The green leaves occur in several rosettes on the woody base. The hairless leaves are spoon-shaped with jagged, toothed tips and measure up to 3.5 centimetres long.

From the rosettes arise inflorescences on peduncles up to 12 centimeters tall. The showy inflorescence is an umbel of several flowers with tubular yellow throats and flat magenta corollas with five jagged or notch-tipped lobes. The fruit is a capsule.

Distribution and habitat
It is endemic to California, where it grows in the high mountains of the Sierra Nevada and Klamath Ranges. It grows in rock cracks, blooming in July and August.

External links
Jepson Manual Treatment - Primula suffrutescens
Primula suffrutescens - Photo gallery

suffrutescens
Endemic flora of California
Flora of the Klamath Mountains
Flora of the Sierra Nevada (United States)
Flora without expected TNC conservation status